Aforia magnifica is a species of sea snail, a marine gastropod mollusk in the family Cochlespiridae.

Description
The size of an adult shell varies between 40 mm and 150 mm. The radula has a large-based unicuspid central tooth.

Distribution
This species is found off the South Sandwich Islands, the South Orkneys, South Shetland, the Antarctic Peninsula and the Weddell Sea, Antarctica

References

 Kantor Y.I., Harasewych M.G. & Puillandre N. (2016). A critical review of Antarctic Conoidea (Neogastropoda). Molluscan Research. DOI: 10.1080/13235818.2015.1128523

External links
 

magnifica
Gastropods described in 1908